Mansur Ali Sarkar Bangladesh Nationalist Party politician. He was elected a member of parliament from undivided Dinajpur-10 (current Dinajpur-5) in 1979. He was the Minister of State for Education and Adviser to the President on Education.

Career 
Mansur Ali Sarkar is a lawyer. He was elected to parliament from Dinajpur-10 (current Dinajpur-5) as a Bangladesh Nationalist Party candidate in 1979 Bangladeshi general election. He joined the Jatiya Party in 1989. He served as the Minister of State for Education and later as the Education Advisor to the President. In 2006 he rejoined the Bangladesh Nationalist Party. He did not get party nomination from Dinajpur-5 in the 2008 and 2018 parliamentary elections.

References 

Living people
Year of birth missing (living people)
People from Dinajpur District, Bangladesh
Bangladesh Nationalist Party politicians
2nd Jatiya Sangsad members